Gerald Woodrow Johnson (September 16, 1917 – April 7, 2005) was born in Spangle, Spokane County, Washington.  He attended Washington State University where he got his master's degree; earned a PhD in 1947 from the University of California, Berkeley.  in the 1950s he oversaw nuclear testing in Nevada and in the Pacific.  He became director of Project Plowshare, researching the uses of peaceful nuclear explosions. In the late '70s he was a representative to the Strategic Arms Limitation Talks II and to the Comprehensive Nuclear-Test-Ban Treaty negotiations.

Writings
 Nuclear Weapons Test Bans: a History

References

External links
 Register of Gerald Johnson, Mandeville Library

1917 births
People from Spokane County, Washington
American nuclear physicists
2005 deaths
Washington State University alumni
University of California, Berkeley alumni